The 2015–16 Stanford Cardinal men's basketball team represented Stanford University during the 2015–16 NCAA Division I men's basketball season. The Cardinal were led by eighth year head coach Johnny Dawkins. They played their home games at Maples Pavilion and were members of the Pac-12 Conference. They finished the season 15–15, 8–10 in Pac-12 play to finish in ninth place. They lost in the first round of the Pac-12 tournament to Washington.

On March 14, head coach Johnny Dawkins was fired. He finished at Stanford with an eight-year record of 156–115, two NIT championships, but only one NCAA Tournament appearance.

Previous season 
The 2014–15 Stanford Cardinal basketball team finished the season with an overall record of 24–13, and 9–9 in conference play. The Cardinal made it to the Quarterfinals of the Pac-12 tournament. The team was invited to the 2015 National Invitation Tournament as a 2-seed. The team defeated Miami (FL) in the Championship game.

Off-season

Departures

2015 recruiting class

Roster

Notes
Dec. 19, 2015 – Sophomore forward Reid Travis out indefinitely with a left leg injury.  On Feb. 23 it was announced Travis would medically redshirt and miss the remainder of the season.

Schedule

|-
!colspan=12 style="background:#8C1515; color:white;"| Non-conference regular season

|-
!colspan=12 style="background:#8C1515;"| Pac-12 regular season

|-
!colspan=12 style="background:#8C1515;"| Pac-12 tournament

References

Stanford
Stanford Cardinal men's basketball seasons
Stanford Cardinal men's b
Stanford Cardinal men's b